HMS Vehement has been the name of more than one British Royal Navy ship:

 , a destroyer launched in 1917 which served in World War I and was sunk in 1918
 , a submarine cancelled in 1944 prior to construction

Royal Navy ship names